Mongolia participated in the 2011 Asian Winter Games in Almaty and Astana, Kazakhstan from January 30, 2011 to February 6, 2011. The bandy team took Mongolia's first ever silver medal at Asian Winter Games.

Alpine skiing

Men

Women

Bandy

All times are Almaty Time (UTC+06:00)

Preliminaries

Final

Figure skating

Women

Freestyle skiing

Men

Women

Ice hockey

Men
The Mongolian team is in the premier division for these games. The roster consists of 21 athletes.

Premier Division

All times are local (UTC+6).

Ski orienteering

Mongolia will send a ski orienteering team.

Men
Gerelt-Od Bayaraa
Byambadorj Bold
Barkhuu Erdenechimeg

Women 
Narantsetseg Altantsetseg
Otgontsetseg Chinbat
Uugantsetseg Nandintsetseg

Short track speed skating

Men
Munkh-Amidral Ganbat

Women
Amarzaya Otgonbayar

Speed skating

Men
Belgutei Galbaatar
Uuganbaatar Galbaatar

Women
Delgermaa Dalanbayar

References

Nations at the 2011 Asian Winter Games
Asian Winter Games
Mongolia at the Asian Winter Games